Eccleston is a village and civil parish of the Borough of Chorley in Lancashire, England. It is beside the River Yarrow, and was formerly an agricultural and later a weaving settlement.

History
Its name came from the Celtic word "eglēs" meaning a church, and the Old English word "tūn" meaning a farmstead or settlement, i.e. a settlement by a Romano-British church. Evidence of the settlement dates back hundreds of years; St. Mary's Church dates back to the 14th century AD.

The village was mentioned in the Domesday Book of 1086, the book ordered by William the Conqueror, to detail all settlements and farms in England for the purpose of tax collection.

Ingrave Farm, located on the northern side of the River Yarrow, is built on a moated site of an earlier building thought to date from the medieval period. About  to the west is a smaller site about  square, the moat of which has since been infilled. It was linked to the larger moat by a still waterlogged channel.

Bradley Hall Farm on the eastern side of the village is also on a moated site of an earlier building, thought to be of similar age. Around the moat there are also three fishponds that were connected to it by water channels. The present farmhouse is excluded from the scheduled monument protection, but it is Grade II listed.

Population
According to the United Kingdom Census 2011, the parish has a population of 4,263.

Governance
Since 2010, Eccleston has been in the constituency of South Ribble for elections for Westminster. Before this, the village was in the constituency of Chorley.

Local government consists of councils at county, district and parish level. At district level, Eccleston is part of the three member Eccleston, Heskin and Charnock Richard ward of Chorley Council, created in 2021 it was previously part of a 3 member ward with Mawdesley From 2002-2021 and before that was combined with Heskin.

Economy
In agrarian times the local speciality was fruit from orchards, few of which now remain. The more recent weaving industry has also passed, as the two local textile mills are now closed. The "Old Mill" building is now being used as an antique, collectable and nostalgia retail space called "Bygone Times".

The "New Mill" was converted into a small village shopping centre which was recently demolished entirely and a new smaller shopping center built with houses being built on the extra space. Consequently, the village has developed a more suburban role than some of its neighbours.

Transport

The town is served by an hourly bus service to Wigan, Preston, Croston and Chorley (daytimes only) with more infrequent daytime services available to Southport and Ormskirk. The nearest railway stations are at Croston and Euxton Balshaw Lane.

Education
The village has two schools, Eccleston St. Mary's Church of England Primary School and Eccleston Primary School.

Religion
There are three churches in the village, the 14th Century St Mary the Virgin Church of England Church to the north of the village (until the reformation this was formerly the Catholic Church), constructed from distinctive Liverpool sandstone, similar to Euxton Parish Church, Eccleston Methodist Church and St Agnes Roman Catholic Church to the south.

Social

The village public house scene has consolidated in recent years. The Original Farmer's Arms is predominantly an eatery located at the Northern end of the village. The village is also served by the Working Men's Institute Club ("th'insty") and the Eccleston Cricket Club (game days only).

The site of the former Blue Anchor pub has been converted to the Anchorfields housing estate and the site of the former windmill pub has been converted to high end apartments. Pubs just outside the village include the Rose and Crown (Ulnes Walton), Farmers Arms (Heskin), Red Lion (Mawdesley). The village also has a popular children's play area situated adjacent to the football pitches, popularly known as "the rec", an abbreviation of recreation area.

Notable people
 St. John Rigby, martyr
 Sir Bradley Wiggins, professional cyclist

See also
Listed buildings in Eccleston, Lancashire
Scheduled monuments in Lancashire

References

External links

Eccleston Parish Council

 
Villages in Lancashire
Civil parishes in Lancashire
Geography of Chorley